Cédric Patrice Thierry Villani (born 5 October 1973) is a French politician and mathematician working primarily on partial differential equations, Riemannian geometry and mathematical physics. He was awarded the Fields Medal in 2010, and he was the director of Sorbonne University's Institut Henri Poincaré from 2009 to 2017. As of September 2022, he is a professor at Institut des Hautes Études Scientifiques.

Villani has given two lectures at the Royal Institution, the first titled 'Birth of a Theorem'. The English translation of his book Théorème vivant (Living Theorem) has the same title. 
In the book he describes the links between his research on kinetic theory and the one of the mathematician Carlo Cercignani: Villani, in fact, proved the so-called Cercignani's conjecture.

His second lecture at the Royal Institution is titled 'The Extraordinary Theorems of John Nash'.

Villani was elected as the deputy for Essonne's 5th constituency in the National Assembly, the lower house of the French Parliament, during the 2017 legislative election.  He was elected as a member of La République En Marche! (LREM), but in May 2020 left the party to form a new party, Ecology, Democracy, Solidarity (EDS). Following the dissolution of EDS, Villani joined Ecology Generation, and ran for re-election under the banner of the NUPES. He was elected Vice President of the French Parliamentary Office for the Evaluation of Scientific and Technological Choices in July 2017.

He lost his seat in the 2022 French legislative election to La Republique En Marche! candidate Paul Midy by 19 votes.

Biography
After attending the Lycée Louis-le-Grand, Villani was admitted at the École Normale Supérieure in Paris and studied there from 1992 to 1996, after which he was appointed an agrégé préparateur at the same school. He received his doctorate at Paris Dauphine University in 1998, under the supervision of Pierre-Louis Lions, and became professor at the École normale supérieure de Lyon in 2000. He is now professor at the University of Lyon. He was director of the Institut Henri Poincaré in Paris from 2009 to 2017.

He has held various visiting positions at Georgia Tech (Fall 1999), the University of California, Berkeley (Spring 2004), and the Institute for Advanced Study, Princeton (Spring 2009).

Mathematical work
Villani has worked on the theory of partial differential equations involved in statistical mechanics, specifically the Boltzmann equation, where, with Laurent Desvillettes, he was the first to prove how quickly convergence occurs for initial values not near equilibrium. He has written with Giuseppe Toscani on this subject. With Clément Mouhot, he has worked on nonlinear Landau damping. He has worked on the theory of optimal transport and its applications to differential geometry, and with John Lott has defined a notion of bounded Ricci curvature for general measured length spaces. He also served on the Mathematical Sciences jury for the Infosys Prize in 2015 and 2016.

Villani received the Fields Medal for his work on Landau damping and the Boltzmann equation. He described the development of his theorem in his autobiographical book Théorème vivant (2012), published in English translation as Birth of a Theorem: A Mathematical Adventure (2015). He gave a TED talk at the 2016 conference in Vancouver.

Political career 

In 2017, it was announced that Villani had been selected as a candidate for En Marche! (LREM) in the 2017 French legislative election, for Essonne's 5th constituency. In the first round of voting, Villani obtained 47% of the vote and was thus strongly placed for the second round which he won with 69.36% of the vote.

In 2019, Villani applied to be selected to lead the LREM candidate slate for the 2020 Paris election. By July 2019, he was one of three LREM candidates, all deputies in the National Assembly, still seeking the position; the other two were Benjamin Griveaux (who had been the government spokesperson) and Hugues Renson (who had been the vice-president of the National Assembly). On 10 July, the nomination committee picked Griveaux. On 4 September, Villani officially announced his candidacy for the municipal election.

Other activities
 France China Foundation, Member of the Strategic Committee

Awards and honours

Diplomas, titles and awards
 1998: PhD Thesis (advisor P.-L. Lions)
 2000: Habilitation dissertation
 2001: Louis Armand Prize of the Academy of Sciences
 2003: Peccot-Vimont Prize and Cours Peccot of the Collège de France
 2003: Plenary lecturer at the International Congress of Mathematical Physics (Lisbonne)
 2004: Harold Grad lecturer
 2004: Visiting Miller Professor, University of California Berkeley. 
 2006: Institut Universitaire de France
 2006: Invited lecturer at the International Congress of Mathematicians (Madrid)
 2007:  (French Academy of Sciences)
 2008: Prize of the European Mathematical Society
 2009: Henri Poincaré Prize
 2009: Fermat Prize
 2010: Fields Medal
 2013: Gibbs lecturer: On Disorder, Mixing and Equilibration
 2014: Joseph L. Doob Prize by the American Mathematical Society for his book Optimal Transport: Old and New (Springer Verlag 2009)

Extra-academic distinctions
 2009: Knight of the National Order of Merit (France)
 2011: Knight of the Legion of Honor
 2013: Member of the French Academy of Sciences
 2016: Ordinary member of the Pontifical Academy of Sciences
 2022: Fellow of the International Science Council

In 2020, a new spider species of the family Araneidae, Araniella villanii, was named after him.

Selected writings
 Limites hydrodynamiques de l'équation de Boltzmann, Séminaire Bourbaki, June 2001; Astérisque vol. 282, 2002.
 A Review of Mathematical Topics in Collisional Kinetic Theory, in Handbook of Mathematical Fluid Dynamics, edited by S. Friedlander and D. Serre, vol. 1, Elsevier, 2002, .  .
 Topics in Optimal Transportation, volume 58 of Graduate Studies in Mathematics, American Mathematical Society, 2003, .
 Optimal transportation, dissipative PDE's and functional inequalities, pp. 53–89 in Optimal Transportation and Applications, edited by L. A. Caffarelli and S. Salsa, volume 1813 of Lecture Notes in Mathematics, Springer, 2003, .
 Cercignani's conjecture is sometimes true and always almost true, Communications in Mathematical Physics, vol. 234, No. 3 (March 2003), pp. 455–490, .
 On the trend to global equilibrium for spatially inhomogeneous kinetic systems: the Boltzmann equation (with Laurent Desvillettes), Inventiones Mathematicae, vol. 159, #2 (2005), pp. 245–316, .
 Mathematics of Granular Materials, Journal of Statistical Physics, vol. 124, #2–4 (July/August 2006), pp. 781–822, .
 Optimal transport, old and new, volume 338 of Grundlehren der mathematischen Wissenschaften, Springer, 2009, .
 Ricci curvature for metric-measure spaces via optimal transport (with John Lott), Annals of Mathematics vol. 169, No. 3 (2009), pp. 903–991.
 Hypocoercivity, volume 202, No. 950 of Memoirs of the American Mathematical Society, 2009, .
 
 Théorème vivant, Bernard Grasset, Paris 2012
 Les Coulisses de la création, Flammarion, Paris 2015 (with composer and pianist Karol Beffa)
 Freedom in Mathematics, Springer India, 2016 (with Pierre Cartier, Jean Dhombres, Gerhard Heinzmann), . Translation from the French language edition: Mathématiques en liberté, La Ville Brûle, Montreuil 2012, .
 Birth of a Theorem, Farrar, Straus and Giroux, New York 2015; translated by Malcolm DeBevoise.
 De mémoire vive, Une histoire de l'aventure numérique, Philippe Dewost, Cédric Villani, Éditions Première Partie, 2022, .

References

External links

 Cédric Villani's website
 
 Video Interview by ICTP
 Review of 'Birth of a Theorem'

1973 births
Living people
French people of Italian descent
People from Brive-la-Gaillarde
20th-century French mathematicians
Mathematical analysts
21st-century French mathematicians
Fields Medalists
Lycée Louis-le-Grand alumni
École Normale Supérieure alumni
Chevaliers of the Légion d'honneur
PDE theorists
Members of the French Academy of Sciences
Institute for Advanced Study visiting scholars
Paris Dauphine University alumni
Academic staff of the University of Lyon
Mathematical physicists
French geometers
La République En Marche! politicians
Ecology Democracy Solidarity politicians
Deputies of the 15th National Assembly of the French Fifth Republic
Young Leaders of the French-American Foundation
Members of Parliament for Essonne